Pimelea filiformis, commonly known as trailing rice flower, is a species of flowering plant in the family Thymelaeaceae and is endemic to Tasmania. It is a prostrate or semi-prostrate undershrub with narrowly elliptic or elliptic leaves and clusters of more or less glabrous, pink or white flowers.

Description
Pimelea filiformis is a prostrate or semi-prostrate undershrub with glabrous stems. The flowers are more or less glabrous, arranged in clusters on the ends of branches, and lack involucral bracts. Flowering occurs from November to January.

Taxonomy
Pimelea filiformis was first formally described in 1847 by Joseph Dalton Hooker in the London Journal of Botany from specimens near Launceston. The specific epithet (filiformis) means "thread-shaped".

Distribution and habitat
This pimelea grows on plains in shrubby forest near Launceston in northern and north-eastern Tasmania. It often forms flat clumps and is often found trailing through other vegetation.

Conservation status
Pimelea filiformis is listed as "rare" in the Tasmanian Government Threatened Species Protection Act 1995.

References

filiformis
Malvales of Australia
Flora of Tasmania
Plants described in 1847
Taxa named by Joseph Dalton Hooker